The PDF Association promotes the adoption and use of International Standards related to PDF technology by assisting enterprise content management (ECM), document management system (DMS) and advanced PDF users with the implementation of PDF technology on an organizational level. In order to assist companies in making the most of PDF technology, the PDF Association provides organizations with information and resources on the variety of International Standards available for PDF.

Mission 
The PDF Association's stated mission is to promote Open Standards-based electronic document implementations using PDF technology through education, expertise and shared experience for stakeholders worldwide.

History 
Established in 2006 as an initiative of the Association for Digital Document Standards (ADDS), and known then as the PDF/A Competence Center (PDFACC), the organization's primary focus was to promote awareness and standards-compliant implementation of PDF/A technology.

In 2011 the PDFACC expanded its scope to cover all of PDF technology and became the PDF Association. Members hail from over 20 countries around the world.  PDF Association chapters can be found in Australia, BeNeLux, France, Germany, Italy, North America, Scandinavia, Spain, Switzerland, and United Kingdom, among others.

See also 
International Organization for Standardization (ISO)
American National Standards Institute (ANSI)

References 

Computer file formats
Organisations based in Berlin
Organizations established in 2006